Ottó Hellmich (6 April 1874 – 2 July 1937) was a Hungarian gymnast who competed in the 1912 Summer Olympics. He was part of the Hungarian team, which won the silver medal in the gymnastics men's team, European system event in 1912.

References

External links
 
profile 

1874 births
1937 deaths
Gymnasts from Budapest
Hungarian male artistic gymnasts
Gymnasts at the 1912 Summer Olympics
Olympic gymnasts of Hungary
Olympic silver medalists for Hungary
Olympic medalists in gymnastics
Medalists at the 1912 Summer Olympics
Sportspeople from the Austro-Hungarian Empire